Jan Romeo Pawłowski (born November 1960) is a Polish prelate of the Catholic Church who works in the diplomatic service of the Holy See.

Biography
Pawlowski was born on 23 November 1960 Biskupiec, Poland, and became an ordained priest in June 1985, before becoming incardinated in 2004. In 1987–1991, he studied at the Pontifical University, obtaining a doctorate in canon law. Pawlowski later studied to join the Holy See's diplomatic service. On 18 March 2009 he was made an archbishop and named the Apostolic Nuncio to the Republic of Congo and Gabon.

On 7 December 2015, Pawlowski was appointed an official of the Secretariat of State. In 2017 Pope Francis named him the head of the newly created third section of that Secretariat, the Section for Diplomatic Staff.

On 1 December 2022, Pope Francis appointed him as nuncio to Greece.

See also
 List of heads of the diplomatic missions of the Holy See

References

1960 births
Living people
Apostolic Nuncios to the Republic of the Congo
Apostolic Nuncios to Gabon
21st-century Roman Catholic archbishops in Africa
21st-century Roman Catholic titular archbishops
Polish Roman Catholic archbishops